Power of the Blues is the fourteenth solo album  by Northern Irish blues guitarist and singer Gary Moore, released in 2004.

Track listing

Personnel
 Gary Moore - vocals, guitar
 Bob Daisley - bass
 Jim Watson - keyboards on "There's a Hole", "That's Why I Play the Blues" and "Can't Find My Baby"
 Darrin Mooney - drums

References

Gary Moore albums
2004 albums
Sanctuary Records albums
Albums produced by Chris Tsangarides